Sam Kim (born February 19, 1998) is an American singer-songwriter, producer, and guitarist based in South Korea. He is signed under Antenna Music, having finished as the runner-up of the talent show K-pop Star 3. He made his official debut on April 10, 2016 with the EP I Am Sam, and followed it with the studio album Sun and Moon on November 22, 2018.

Life and career
Sam Kim was born in the United States, where he attended Todd Beamer High School in Federal Way, Washington. He has a younger brother Jooyoung and sister, Sujin. After passing preliminary auditions in Los Angeles, Kim moved to South Korea at the age of 15 to participate in the third season of the talent show K-pop Star. He placed second in the competition and was signed by Antenna Music's CEO You Hee-yeol, a judge on the show.

Kim released the first part of his debut EP, My Name Is Sam, on March 28, 2016.<ref>{{cite web |url=http://tenasia.hankyung.com/archives/896169 |script-title=ko:'K팝스타3' 기타소년 샘김, 3년 만에 데뷔..싱어송라이터로 성장텐아시아 |trans-title=K-pop Star 3'''s 'Guitar Boy' Sam Kim to debut after three years...growing as a singer-songwriter |date=March 16, 2016 |access-date=September 8, 2016 |language=ko |first=Soo-jung |last=Park |archive-date=June 12, 2018 |archive-url=https://web.archive.org/web/20180612141013/http://tenasia.hankyung.com/archives/896169 |url-status=dead }}</ref>
It contained three tracks including the pre-release single "Mama Don't Worry". His full-length EP, I Am Sam, was released on April 10. Its lead single was "No 눈치 (No Sense)", featuring Crush.
His debut performance was at the finale stage of K-pop Star 5 on the same day.

The music video for the single "Make Up" was released on October 23, 2018,  ahead of Kim's upcoming studio album, Sun and Moon''. It was Kim's second lead single to feature Crush. The full album was released on November 22, 2018, along with a music video for the second single "It's You", featuring Zico.

Personal life 
On January 26, 2023, Antenna Music announced that Sam Kim's father passed away in a robbery shooting. According to local media on the 13th (US time), a robbery shooting occurred at a restaurant in Seattle, USA. Sam Kim's father as a restaurant owner became a victim and was taken to a nearby hospital, but passed away. The funeral was held at Bonnie Watson Funeral Home in the United States on the 24th after the investigation was over.

Discography

Studio albums

Extended plays

Singles

Soundtrack appearances

Other charted songs

Features

Kpop Star 3 songs

Songwriting credits

The following credits are adapted from the Korea Music Copyright Association database, unless indicated otherwise.

Concerts and tours

Headlining concerts
 Sam Kim 1st Concert: Sun and Moon (Seoul; February 16–17, 2019)
 Sam Kim 2019 Europe Tour (Paris, London, Berlin; April 27–30, 2019)
 Sam Kim 2019 Concert in Singapore (Singapore; July 26, 2019)
 2019 Sam Kim Live: Kunge (Seoul; November 23–24, 2019)

Collaborative concerts
 Hello, Antenna: The Label Concert (Seoul; September 23–25, 2016)
 Antenna Angels Concert:  (Seoul; March 16–19, 2017) 
 With, Antenna: The Label Concert (Seoul, Busan, Daegu, Los Angeles, New York; September 2–29, 2017)

As opening act
 Charlie Puth: Nine Track Mind tour (Seoul; August 18, 2016) 
 Tom Misch: 2018 Asia Tour (Seoul; August 21, 2018)

Filmography

Television

Web shows

Awards and nominations

Notes

References

External links

1998 births
Living people
American K-pop singers
Korean-language singers of the United States
American child singers
American male pop singers
American soul singers
American contemporary R&B singers
American pop guitarists
American rhythm and blues guitarists
American soul guitarists
American male guitarists
American male singer-songwriters
American rhythm and blues singer-songwriters
American musicians of Korean descent
American people of South Korean descent
K-pop Star participants
Musicians from Seattle
People from Federal Way, Washington
Antenna Music artists
Singer-songwriters from Washington (state)
Guitarists from Washington (state)
21st-century American singers
21st-century American guitarists
21st-century American male singers
American expatriates in South Korea